CoGo Bike Share is a public bicycle sharing system serving Columbus, Ohio and its suburbs. The service is operated by the bikeshare company Motivate (part of Lyft, Inc.) It was created in July 2013 with 300 bikes and 30 docking stations, since expanded to about 600 bikes and 80 stations. The service is operated in conjunction with the City of Columbus, which owns all equipment.

History

CoGo Bike Share was launched on July 30, 2013 in Columbus. It opened with 300 bikes and 30 docking stations in downtown and surrounding areas, operated by Alta Bicycle Share (since rebranded as Motivate). The bikes and stations were designed and constructed by PBSC Urban Solutions. The network's original boundaries were Second Avenue north of downtown, Parsons Avenue east of downtown, south to German Village, and west to Route 315. The City of Columbus provided a subsidy for CoGo's first year with an initial $2.3 million investment in equipment, though afterward the program became self-sustaining. In 2015, the city purchased 110 bikes and 11 stations to expand to the Near East Side, Weinland Park, and the southern end of the Ohio State University campus.

In 2015, Ohio State University launched a 115-bicycle, 15-station system on its campus. The university decided not to integrate with the city's CoGo system, instead utilizing Zagster to operate its system. The city had desired a unified system, though the university preferred Zagster's cost and variety of bike models. The program would include commuter, tandem, handle cycle, electric assist, heavy duty, and three-wheeled cargo bicycles as part of its system.

In 2016, the system became the second in the United States to utilize Transit app payments. After a pilot in Aspen, Colorado, Transit began offering its payment system to CoGo, allowing riders to unlock bikes using their smartphones. In late 2019, after CoGo's operator was purchased by Lyft, the latter company announced it was revoking use of the Transit app, forcing users to utilize its Lyft app to unlock bikes on smartphones.

Company
The service is operated by the bikeshare company Motivate, part of Lyft, Inc. since 2018.

Bikes

CoGo maintains approximately 600 bicycles across the city.  The City of Columbus owns all equipment, contracting the operations to Lyft. E-bikes were added to the system in June 2020.

Payment

The bikes are available for short term rental, using a credit card or member key fob. Additionally, the Lyft app allows users to unlock bikes with their smartphones.

The payment system is broken down into several options:
Single fare: $2 per ride (up to 30 minutes). E-bikes have a $.15 additional fee per minute.
Day pass: single $8 charge. E-bikes have a $.15 additional fee per minute.
Annual membership: $75 per year for unlimited 45-minute rides. E-bikes have a $.10 additional fee per minute.
CoGo for All: $5 annual membership for unlimited 45-minute rides. E-bikes have a $.05 additional fee per minute (program requires SNAP benefits or discounted utility payments).
Note: parking e-bikes in public bike racks (as opposed to a docking station) carries a $1 fee.

See also
 List of bicycle-sharing systems

References

External links

 
 Docking station map

Community bicycle programs
Transportation in Columbus, Ohio
2013 establishments in Ohio
Bicycle sharing in the United States